The Canton of Saint-Méen-le-Grand is a former canton of France, in the Ille-et-Vilaine département, located southwest of Rennes. It had 11,135 inhabitants (2012). It was disbanded following the French canton reorganisation which came into effect in March 2015. It consisted of 9 communes, which joined the canton of Montauban-de-Bretagne in 2015. It is located between Rennes and Brest.

The canton comprised the following communes:

 Bléruais
 Le Crouais
 Gaël
 Muel
 Quédillac
 Saint-Malon-sur-Mel
 Saint-Maugan
 Saint-Méen-le-Grand
 Saint-Onen-la-Chapelle

References

Saint-Meen-le-Grand
2015 disestablishments in France
States and territories disestablished in 2015